Aetomilitsa (before 1927: Δέντσικο - Dentsiko) is a village in the Ioannina regional unit, Epirus, Greece. Since the 2011 local government reform it is part of the municipality Konitsa, of which it is a municipal unit. Before 2011, it was an independent community. The 2011 census recorded 432 residents in the village.

Geography
The village lies on the Gramos mountain. A glacial lake, Moutsalia Lake is situated 5 km as the crow flies or 13 km drive on a dirt road from Aetomilitsa.

Climate
Aetomilitsa has a warm-summer humid continental climate (Köppen climate classification: Dfb) using the 0 °C (32 °F) isotherm, or a temperate oceanic climate (Köppen climate classification: Cfb) using the -3 °C (27 °F) isotherm for the coldest month. Aetomilitsa experiences cold winters with high precipitation and warm, drier summers.

History
Aetomilitsa is today inhabited mainly by Aromanians (Vlachs) who are Greek Orthodox Christians. For a time during the Greek Civil War (1946-1949), Aetomilitsa was the seat of the communist rebels, the so-called "Provisional Democratic Government".

References

Populated places in Ioannina (regional unit)
Aromanian settlements in Greece